Irfan Haider (born 1 October 1985) is a Pakistani cricketer. He made his first-class debut for Pakistan Telecommunication Company Limited in the 2003–04 Patron's Trophy on 12 January 2004.

References

External links
 

1985 births
Living people
Pakistani cricketers
Lahore Blues cricketers
Pakistan Telecommunication Company Limited cricketers
Place of birth missing (living people)